Quondam may refer to:
John Sutton, 3rd Baron Dudley (1494–1553), English nobleman nicknamed Lord Quondam
An early spelling of condom
Quondam, a 1965 novel by David Pryce-Jones
Quondam, a 1984 Acornsoft game

See also
Quantum (disambiguation)